Truro and Penwith College is a tertiary college and further education college in Cornwall, United Kingdom.

History
Truro College was founded in 1993 as a new college in Gloweth near Threemilestone, Truro, Cornwall, to replace the Truro Sixth Form College. Penwith College was founded in 1980 in Penzance, and was known until 1990 as Penwith Sixth Form College. It then became a tertiary college named Penwith College. The decision to merge the two colleges was made in 2006, with the merger completed in 2008.

It has assisted the creation of the Ofsted Outstanding Callywith College, a Further Education college in Bodmin, which opened in September 2017 and was rated the best sixth form college in England in 2020. Three of the college's students, who were identical triplets, all went to Cambridge University in 2004, the first set of triplets to do so.
The Rick Stein Academy was launched in 2015 as a partnership between the Rick Stein Group and Truro and Penwith College, in 2016 it was recognized as a Top 100 Apprenticeship Employer nationally. In 2016 Truro and Penwith College won the Association of Colleges Beacon Award for Leadership and Governance.
It is the top non-selective provider of the International Baccalaureate Diploma in the UK, according to Sunday Times Parent Power league tables. 
In 2020 it was recognised as the best provider of Hair and Beauty apprenticeships in the UK.
In 2015 it had the highest A Level points-per-student and value-added progress score in the UK. In 2015 one of its students was awarded the 'Outstanding BTEC Student of the Year' award. In 2012 two of its students got the highest marks in the country for English Language and Law. 
The college hosts the annual Cornwall Apprenticeship Awards.
Upcoming developments include the South West Institute of Technology on the Truro College campus, a Cornwall STEM Skills Centre in Bodmin, and the Stadium for Cornwall.

In June 2021, the college was one of the ten institutions that the University and College Union opened ballots for industrial action in over pay, working conditions and compulsory redundancies.

Courses

Courses available include further education such as A Levels, T levels, Vocational Qualifications (including BTEC Diplomas, National Vocational Qualifications (NVQs) and apprenticeships), Foundation Studies, and the International Baccalaureate Diploma; higher education such as honours degrees, foundation degrees, Higher National Diplomas, higher level nursing apprenticeships, education qualifications, other professional qualifications;part-time and evening courses. Teacher training is done on PGCE, CertEd and Cornwall SCITT courses. Cornwall SCITT (School Centred Initial Teacher Training, a partnership of 16 local secondary schools, one special school and Truro and Penwith College, offering postgraduate teacher training to the 11-16 age range, with post-16 enhancements) retained its own Ofsted Outstanding rating in 2016.

Results
It was the first tertiary college to be awarded 'Outstanding' status, the highest designation by Ofsted in 2006, and the first to retain an Outstanding rating, in 2016.
In the 2019 Six Nations Rugby Union game between England and Ireland, four of the players on the pitch were graduates from its Rugby Academy, Luke Cowan-Dickie, Jack Nowell, Henry Slade, and Bundee Aki.
It has been recognised as the top non-selective provider of the International Baccalaureate Diploma in the UK, the best provider of Hair and Beauty apprenticeships in the UK, having the highest A Level points-per-student and value-added progress score in the UK, the top BTEC student of the year, and having its students get the highest marks in the country for several subjects.

A Levels
In 2015, the college had the highest A Level points-per-student and value-added progress score in the UK. In 2020, A Level students achieved a 99.7% overall pass rate for the 700 students, 88% passing with A*-C, and there was a 100% pass rate achieved in 37 subjects.

International Baccalaureate
In 2020, International Baccalaureate students achieved an average of just over 36 points, equivalent to three A* grades and one A grade at A Level. 23% of the IB students at Truro gained 40 points or more, equivalent to four A*s or more than five As at A Level. In 2021, the college achieved an average score of 38.4 points, with almost half of the cohort getting 40 points or more. One student scored 45, the highest score possible.

Truro College is regularly rated the top non-selective provider of the International Baccalaureate Diploma in the UK in the Sunday Times Parent Power league tables.

BTEC Extended Diploma
In 2020, 66% of the 900 Level 3 Extended Diploma students achieved a Triple Distinction and on BTEC Diploma courses as a whole over 200 students achieved the highest possible grade, Triple Distinction Star.

2016 Ofsted Inspection

Truro and Penwith College was rated as being Outstanding by Ofsted in 2016, the first FE provider to be awarded this highest designation under the new Ofsted assessment framework, and making it the first college to ever retain an Outstanding rating.

Sport and Academies

In the 2019 Six Nations Rugby Union game between England and Ireland, four of the players on the pitch were graduates from its Rugby Academy, Luke Cowan-Dickie, Jack Nowell, Henry Slade, and Bundee Aki.
The Truro College Rugby Academy is an Exeter Chiefs Academy team. The college competes in the AASE league along with the other premiership academies and the Association of Colleges Sport Leagues and Cups and has won the Daily Mail Cup, British Colleges U19 Knock-Out Cup, National 10s and 7s, South West Colleges League, Samurai 7s, AASE League Plate and have been AoC Premier Cup Finalists. Rugby Academy players regularly sign for teams such as the Exeter Chiefs, Cornish Pirates, Redruth R.F.C. or Cornish All-Blacks before their studies at the college have finished. The Academy team plays in the Sanix Tournament in Japan against the other best under-18s rugby teams from around the world.

The Truro College Football Development program is in association with the Chelsea F.C. Foundation.  Truro and Penwith College's football teams play in official Chelsea kits and benefit from world-class training at Chelsea FC throughout the year.

Notable alumni
 Bundee Aki, Ireland rugby player
 Molly Caudery, Pole Vaulter
 Luke Cowan-Dickie, England rugby player
 Josh Matavesi, Fiji rugby player
 Sam Matavesi, Fiji rugby player
 Jack Nowell, England rugby player
 Ben Oliver, Athlete, Wheelchair Racer

References

External links 

Truro and Penwith College website

Further education colleges in Cornwall
Truro
Penzance
International Baccalaureate schools in England
Educational institutions established in 2008
2008 establishments in England